The Attainder of Earl of Kellie and Others Act 1745 (19 & 20 Geo.II c. 26) was a parliamentary response to the failed Jacobite rising of 1745.

By this Act, the Earl of Kellie and others numbering upwards of three dozen who did not surrender themselves by 12 July 1746 were attainted of high treason. Justices of the realm were under this Act instructed to commit the persons who surrendered, and to give notice to a Secretary of State.

References

Great Britain Acts of Parliament 1745